Coleophora mausoleae is a moth of the family Coleophoridae. It is found in Uzbekistan.

The larvae feed on Mausolea eriocarpa. They feed on the leaves of their host plant.

References

mausoleae
Fauna of Uzbekistan
Moths described in 1978
Moths of Asia